A System of Logic, Ratiocinative and Inductive is an 1843 book by English philosopher John Stuart Mill.

Overview
In this work, he formulated the five principles of inductive reasoning that are known as Mill's Methods. This work is important in the philosophy of science, and more generally, insofar as it outlines the empirical principles Mill would use to justify his moral and political philosophies.

An article in "Philosophy of Recent Times" has described this book as an "attempt to expound a psychological system of logic within empiricist principles.”

This work was important to the history of science, being a strong influence on scientists such as Dirac. A System of Logic also had an impression on Gottlob Frege, who rebuked many of Mill's ideas about the philosophy of mathematics in his work The Foundations of Arithmetic.

Mill revised the original work several times over the course of thirty years in response to critiques and commentary by Whewell, Bain, and others.

Editions
 Mill, John Stuart, A System of Logic, University Press of the Pacific, Honolulu, 2002,

See also
 Emergentism

References

Sources
 Philosophy of Recent Times, ed. J. B. Hartmann (New York: McGraw-Hill, 1967), I, 14.

External links

Online editions
 1843. Google Books: Vol. I, Vol. II (first edition)
 1846. Google Books: All
 1851. Google Books: Vol. I, Vol. II missing? Internet Archive: Vol. I, Vol. II missing? (third edition)
 1858. Google Books: All
 1862. Google Books: Vol. I, Vol. II
 1868. Internet Archive: Vol. I, Vol. II. Also Vol. I, Vol. II. Also Vol. I (seventh edition)
 1872. Internet Archive: Vol. I, Vol. II. Also partial HTML version.(eighth edition)
 1882. Internet Archive: All
 1882. Project Gutenberg: All
 

1843 non-fiction books
Books by John Stuart Mill
Logic books
Philosophy of science